Mohammad Sarwar Mir is an Indian actor, who has appeared in Hindi films including Kesari, Bajrangi Bhaijaan, and Jolly LLB 2.

Career

Mir Sarwar started his career with renowned directors M K Raina and Bapi Bose in Delhi. He was part of three National School of Drama workshops. He moved to Mumbai permanently in late 2014, before being cast in two high-profile films, Bajrangi Bhaijaan (2015) and Phantom (2015). In the former, he played the father of the lost Pakistani girl Shahida, who is guided by Salman Khan's character back to Pakistan.

Sarwar also worked on the production of Kashmir Daily, a self-financed Kashmiri film venture. He is involved in making Kashmiri films and contributes to the industry's projects without charging a fee in order to encourage film making among local residents. Mir has recently Directed a Film BED NO.17 in Srinagar and the film will be screened in several film festivals. In 2017, Sarwar worked on the production of Mani Ratnam's Tamil film Kaatru Veliyidai (2017) and shot for the film in Hyderabad and Ladakh. He successfully auditioned for the film, with date clashes meaning he opted out of his role in Naam Shabana (2017) for the opportunity.

Kedarnath was released on 7 December 2018. In 2019 he appeared in the films Kesari, Notebook and Hamid. After Kesari, Panipat, Chanakya, Jai Hind, Pawan Putra and some web series like  The Family Man, Bard of Blood, Bhram and Special Ops released.

Mir Sarwar played the protagonist in Half Widow, Kashmir Daily, and Lihaaf. He played the negative lead in Dharma Productions' Kesari (2019).. Recently Mir Sarwar wrote and directed the prayer song "Ya Khuda" in the COVID-19 lockdown, which had most of the veteran actors on J&K.

Filmography

Films

Web series

References

External links
 

Living people
Male actors in Tamil cinema
21st-century Indian male actors
Male actors from Jammu and Kashmir
1977 births